Prototheora parachlora is a species of moth of the family Prototheoridae. It is found in South Africa, where it is only known from the Karkloof Forest region of KwaZulu-Natal.

The wingspan is about 15 mm. The only known adult was collected in late January.

References

Endemic moths of South Africa
Hepialoidea
Moths described in 1919
Moths of Africa